The Woodend/Hesket Football Club, known as the Hawks, is an Australian Rules Football club playing in the Riddell District Football League.

The club is located 65 km north west of Melbourne in the township of Woodend.
 
The Club first played as Woodend-Hesket in 1978 following the merger between Woodend FC and Hesket FC.
The Senior Club plays home games at the Gilbert Gordon oval.

The club's main feeder team is the Woodend Junior Football Club (Woodend Hawks - www.woodendhawks.com.au) who were established 1973 and play their home games at the Woodend Racecourse.

Histories

Hesket Football Club

Formed in 1873 the Hesket club participated in the local competitions including the Riddell Football League from 1920. The colours were red and white. In 1971 the club went into recess after the season only to reform in 1975 in the RDFL 2nd Division. The club merged with Woodend in 1978.

Premierships
 1910, 1921, 1925, 1926, 1960

Woodend Football Club

Formed in 1880 the Woodend club participated in the local competitions including the Riddell Football League from 1920. From 1925 Woodend played against local Castlemaine sides until returning to the Riddell DFL in 1953. The colours were navy blue.  After finishing last in 1977 the club merged with Hesket in 1978.

Premierships
 1889, 1893, 1895, 1896, 1900, 1904, 1914, 1930, 1931, 1937, 1954, 1964

Premierships

1978, 1983 (both Second Division)
2002, 2007 (both Senior Division)

Reserves
2008

Under 18's
 2003
 2007
 2009
 2011

References

Books
History of Football in the Bendigo District - John Stoward - 

Riddell District Football League clubs
1978 establishments in Australia
Sports clubs established in 1978
Shire of Macedon Ranges
Australian rules football clubs in Victoria (Australia)